The Conquest of You is an album by the American musical group Kid Creole and the Coconuts, released in 1997.

Track listing

References

1997 albums
Kid Creole and the Coconuts albums